Cloxotestosterone acetate (brand name Caprosem), also known as testosterone 17β-chloral hemiacetal O-acetate, is a synthetic, injected anabolic–androgenic steroid (AAS) and an androgen ether and ester – specifically, the O-acetate ester of cloxotestosterone, the 17β-trichloro hemiacetal ether of testosterone. It is administered via intramuscular injection as a 100 mg, 2 mL aqueous suspension and lasts 4 to 6 weeks with a single administration. The drug was first marketed in the early 1960s.

See also
 List of androgen esters

References

Acetate esters
Androgen ethers
Androgens and anabolic steroids
Androstanes
Organochlorides
Prodrugs
Testosterone esters